The Law Reports is the name of a series of law reports published by the Incorporated Council of Law Reporting.

Pursuant to a practice direction given by Lord Judge during his tenure as the Lord Chief Justice of England and Wales, the Law Reports are "the most authoritative reports" and should always be "cited in preference where there is a choice." This requirement is further referred to in respect of appeals to the Court of Appeal in paragraph 29(2) of Practice Direction 52C of the Civil Procedure Rules. 

This series is now divided into four main sub-series:

Law Reports, Appeal Cases, covering decisions of the House of Lords (and, since 2009, the Supreme Court), the Privy Council and the Court of Appeal – started in 1866 as the Law Reports, English & Irish Appeals, renamed in 1875 and redesigned in 1891;
Law Reports, Chancery Division, covering decisions of the Chancery Division of the High Court – started in 1865 as the Law Reports, Chancery Appeal Cases, renamed in 1875 and redesigned in 1890;
Law Reports, Family Division, covering decisions of the Family Division of the High Court – started in 1865 as the Law Reports, Probate & Divorce Cases, renamed Law Reports, Probate, Divorce & Admiralty Division in 1875, renamed Law Reports, Probate in 1891 and renamed in 1972; and
Law Reports, Queen's Bench, covering decision of the Queen's Bench Division of the High Court – started in 1865, renamed Law Reports, Queen's Bench Division in 1875, renamed in 1891, renamed Law Reports, King's Bench in 1901 and renamed in 1952.

Series
The number and names of the series have changed. This is partly due to the merger of existing courts, the merger of existing divisions of individual courts, and the creation of new divisions of individual courts. Citation of series has also changed.

1865 to 1875
The Law Reports were originally divided into eleven series. Glanville Williams said that "roughly speaking" there was a series for each of the superior courts. The series were:

House of Lords, English and Irish Appeals
House of Lords, Scotch and Divorce Appeals
Privy Council Appeals
Chancery Appeal Cases
Equity Cases
Crown Cases Reserved
Queens Bench Cases
Common Pleas Cases
Exchequer Cases
Admiralty and Ecclesiastical Cases
Probate and Divorce Cases

House of Lords, English and Irish Appeals. These reports may be cited thus:

House of Lords, Scotch and Divorce Appeals. These reports may be cited in the following ways:

Privy Council Appeals. These reports may be cited thus:

Chancery Appeal Cases. These reports may be cited in the following ways:

Equity Cases. These reports may be cited thus:

Crown Cases Reserved. These reports may be cited in the following ways:

Queens Bench Cases. These reports may be cited thus:

Common Pleas Cases. These reports may be cited thus:

Exchequer Cases. These reports may be cited thus:

Admiralty and Ecclesiastical Cases. These reports may be cited thus:

Probate and Divorce Cases. These reports may be cited thus:

1875 to 1880
In 1875, the number of series was reduced to six. This was due to the creation of the High Court and a decision on the part of the publishers, to put the House of Lords, the Privy Council and the new Court of Appeal in the same volume, and to group Crown Cases Reserved and the Queen's Bench Division together. The series were:

Appeal Cases
Chancery Division
Queens Bench Division
Common Pleas Division
Exchequer Division
Probate Division

There was a change in the mode of citation. The abbreviation "LR" ceased to be used.

Appeal Cases. These reports may be cited thus:

Chancery Division. These reports may be cited thus:

Queens Bench Division. These reports may be cited thus:

Common Pleas Division. These reports may be cited thus:

Exchequer Division. These reports may be cited thus:

Probate Division. These reports may be cited thus:

1881 to 1890
In 1881, the number of series was reduced to four. This is because the Common Pleas and Exchequer Divisions of the High Court were incorporated in the Queen's Bench Division of that court in 1880:

Appeal Cases
Chancery Division
Queens Bench Division
Probate Division

Appeal Cases. These reports may be cited thus:

Chancery Division. These reports may be cited thus:

Queens Bench Division. These reports may be cited thus:

Probate Division. These reports may be cited thus:

1891 onwards
There have continued to be four series during this period, but their names have changed from time to time.

Appeal Cases
Chancery Division
Queens Bench Division (1891 - 1901, 1952 onwards)/Kings Bench Division (1901 - 1952) (From 1907, this series included decisions of the Court of Criminal Appeal in place of the former Court for Crown Cases Reserved.)
Probate (Replaced in 1972 by a series called Family, due to the creation of the Family Division of the High Court)

In 1891, there was a change in the mode of citation. Volumes published from 1891 onwards are cited by the year in which they were published and numbered according to the order of publication in that year, if more than one volume has been published in that year.

Appeal Cases. These reports may be cited thus:

Chancery Division. These reports may be cited thus:

Queens Bench Division. These reports may be cited thus:

Kings Bench Division. These reports may be cited thus:

Probate Division. These reports may be cited thus:

Family Division. These reports may be cited thus:

See also 
 Law report: England and Wales

References
O Hood Phillips. A First Book of English Law. Fourth Edition. Sweet & Maxwell. 1960. pp 164 – 166.

External links

 

Case law reporters of the United Kingdom
English law